Cortodera militaris is a species of flower longhorn in the beetle family Cerambycidae. It is found in North America.

Subspecies
These three subspecies belong to the species Cortodera militaris:
 Cortodera militaris constans Linsley & Chemsak, 1972
 Cortodera militaris militaris (LeConte, 1850)
 Cortodera militaris variipes (Casey, 1891)

References

Further reading

 
 

Lepturinae
Articles created by Qbugbot
Beetles described in 1850